The 2007 World Rowing Championships were World Rowing Championships that were held from 26 August to 2 September 2007 at Oberschleißheim Regatta Course near Munich, Germany.

Medal summary

Men's events
 Non-Olympic classes

Women's events
 Non-Olympic classes

Paralympic events

Medal table

Men's and women's events

Paralympic events

References

World Rowing Championships
World Rowing Championships
Sports competitions in Munich
Rowing Championships
Rowing competitions in Germany
2000s in Munich
2007 in German sport
August 2007 sports events in Europe
Rowing